The Capitan Grande Reservation is a Kumeyaay Indian reservation in San Diego County, California, jointly controlled by the Barona Group of Capitan Grande Band of Mission Indians and Viejas Group of Capitan Grande Band of Mission Indians. The reservation is uninhabited and is  large, located in the Cuyamaca Mountains and middle of the Cleveland National Forest and west of Cuyamaca Peak. The closest town is Alpine, California.

History

The reservation was created by President Ulysses S. Grant, via executive order in 1875 for local Kumeyaay people. Its name comes from the Spanish Coapan, which was what the area west of the San Diego River was called in the 19th century.  The dry, mountainous and chaparral lands proved inhospitable.

In 1931, the state flooded the heart of the reservation, creating the El Capitan Reservoir. Many Kumeyaay families had homes in the floodzone, and they petitioned Congress to prevent the loss of their land; however, Congress gave San Diego the right to buy the land without the local Kumeyaays' knowledge or consent. The two tribes, Barona and Viejas, were forced to sell the land and with their proceeds they purchased their current reservations, the Barona Reservation and Viejas Reservation, respectively.

In 1973, 7 people lived on the reservation.

Today
Today, the two tribes have a joint-trust patent of the remaining reservation. It is undeveloped but serves as an ecological preserve.

Bibliography

References

External links
 Barona Band of Mission Indians, official website
 Viejas Band of Kumeyaay Indians, official website

American Indian reservations in California
Cuyamaca Mountains
East County (San Diego County)
1875 establishments in California
Kumeyaay populated places
Former Native American populated places in California